Oaks Correctional Facility (ECF) is a Michigan Department of Corrections facility in Manistee Township, Michigan, near Manistee.

Facilities and Grounds 
The facility has four general population housing units with double bunked beds. Each unit houses up to 192 men. In addition the prison has two administrative segregation units, including a special use unit.

Notable inmates
 Tim Holland - Adoptive father of Ricky Holland. Pleaded guilty to Second Degree Murder and testified against his wife, Lisa Holland in her murder trial where she was subsequently found guilty of murder and is serving a life sentence.
 Jack Kevorkian
 Kwame Kilpatrick
 Jason Dalton, 2016 Kalamazoo shooter.

See also

 List of Michigan state prisons

References

Prisons in Michigan
Buildings and structures in Manistee County, Michigan
1992 establishments in Michigan